The 1985 U.S. Open was the 85th U.S. Open, held June 13–16 at the South Course of Oakland Hills Country Club in Bloomfield Hills, Michigan, a suburb northwest of Detroit. Andy North, the 1978 champion, won his second U.S. Open title by a stroke over runners-up Dave Barr, Chen Tze-chung, and Denis Watson.

Chen had a historic beginning to the U.S. Open. In his first three rounds, he established a new course record at Oakland Hills with a 65, made the first double eagle in U.S. Open history, and established both 36 and 54-hole scoring records. Heading into the final round, he owned a two-stroke advantage over North, who shot 65 in the second round and 70 in the third. Chen increased his lead over North to four shots after just four holes of play. But at the 5th hole, disaster struck for Chen as he saw his lead dissolve in unique fashion. His approach shot from the fairway found deep rough well short and right of the green. His first chip shot stopped several yards short of the green. Hitting his fourth shot, and still in the deep rough, Chen's wedge got tangled up in the grass upon impact and struck the ball a second time on the follow-thru, sending the ball careening short of the green. Chen was assessed the stroke and a penalty. Now lying five, he chipped on and two-putted for a quadruple bogey 8. He had seen a four-stroke lead vanish in one hole and was now tied with playing partner North.

Unnerved by the mistake, Chen proceeded to bogey the next three holes, and North took a one-stroke lead over Barr at the turn. Chen recovered with a birdie at 12, and with North bogeying 9, 10, and 11, he found himself back in the lead. North, however, would be the last man standing. He birdied 13 while Chen bogeyed 14 and 17, and Barr bogeyed his final two holes.  At the 18th, Chen narrowly missed a bunker shot to miss a chance at forcing a playoff, and both Barr and Chen finished at 280. North could protect his lead and two-putted for bogey and a one-stroke victory.

Penalties played an additional role in the 1985 U.S. Open, as Denis Watson of Zimbabwe, who also finished 1-stroke behind North, had been assessed a two-stroke penalty in the first-round for taking too long over a putt, as USGA rules allowed a 10-second wait for a ball resting on the cup edge, and an official ruled he took 35-seconds and assessed the penalty. The rules to assess penalties on both Chen and Watson have since been changed.

In the final round, North hit only four fairways and recorded just one birdie. For the tournament, he had just nine birdies, the lowest by a champion in post-World War II U.S. Open history. North finished at 279 (−1), the only player to finish under par. It was his first PGA Tour win since the 1978 U.S. Open, and was his last on tour.

Jack Nicklaus shot 149 (+9) and missed the cut by three strokes, ending a streak of 21 consecutive cuts made at the U.S. Open.

This was the seventh major championship at the South Course, which previously hosted the U.S. Open in 1924, 1937, 1951, and 1961, and the PGA Championship in 1972 and 1979.  It later hosted the U.S. Open in 1996 and the PGA Championship in 2008.

Course layout

South Course 

Lengths of the course for previous majors:

Past champions in the field

Made the cut

Missed the cut 

Source:

Round summaries

First round
Thursday, June 13, 1985

Second round
Friday, June 14, 1985

Amateurs: Sigel (+5), Verplank (+6), Randolph (+7), Townes (+12), Van Orman (+17), Tominaga (+18), Janzen (+21), Townes (+22)

Third round
Saturday, June 15, 1985

Final round
Sunday, June 16, 1985

Amateurs: Scott Verplank (+9), Jay Sigel (+22)

Scorecard
Final round

Cumulative tournament scores, relative to par

Source:

References

External links
USGA Championship Database
USOpen.com  1985

U.S. Open (golf)
Golf in Michigan
Bloomfield Hills, Michigan
U.S. Open
U.S. Open (golf)
U.S. Open (golf)
U.S. Open (golf)